Radio Thailand World Service is the official international broadcasting station of Thailand. It was launched on 20 October 1938 under callsign HSK-9. Owned by the National Broadcasting Services of Thailand, the station broadcasts in 10 languages: Thai, English, Chinese, Burmese, Lao, Khmer, Malay, German, Japanese and Vietnamese. RTWS is broadcast on the shortwave band using the relay transmitter tower of Voice of America in Ban Dung District, Udon Thani.

External links

International broadcasters
Radio in Thailand
Radio stations established in 1938
1938 establishments in Siam